Created Equal is a 2017 legal drama film directed by Bill Duke. It was shown at several festivals in 2017 before being released in the United States on January 16, 2018.

Plot
A woman attempting to become a priest solicits the help of a young attorney to sue the Archdiocese of New Orleans for sex discrimination.

Cast

 Lou Diamond Phillips as Monsignor Renzulli
 Aaron Tveit as Tommy Reilly
 Gregory Alan Williams as Judge Watford
 Edy Ganem as Alejandra Batista

Production
Production began in 2016.

Release
The film premiered at the American Black Film Festival at 4:00 p.m. on June 15, 2017, before being released in the United States on January 16, 2018.

References

External links
 

2017 films
2010s legal drama films
Films directed by Bill Duke
American legal drama films
Films about discrimination
Films about sexism
Films about Catholic priests
Films set in New Orleans
2017 drama films
2010s English-language films
2010s American films